Ban Dung is a town (Thesaban Mueang) in north-eastern Thailand and the local government seat of  Ban Dung district (Amphoe) in the province of Udon Thani  in the Isan region. As of 2017, it had a total population of 15,836 people.

Education
Numerous primary schools serve the area. High school education is provided by Bandubg Wittaya School.

Transport
The town is adjacent to the intersection of Highway 2022 and Highway 2096.
Local town transport is provided by Isan tuk-tuk style Samlor motor tricycle taxis. Regional and long distance bus services operate from the bus terminal.

The nearest railway stations are in Nong Khai (83 km) and Udon Thani (81 km) and the nearest full-service airport is Udon Thani International Airport at 88 km.

References

Populated places in Udon Thani province
Populated places in Thailand